"Believe women" is an American political slogan arising out of the #MeToo movement. It refers to accepting women's allegations of sexual harassment or sexual assault at face value. Jude Doyle, writing for Elle, argues that the phrase means "don't assume women as a gender are especially deceptive or vindictive, and recognize that false allegations are less common than real ones."

The phrase grew in popularity in response to the Brett Kavanaugh Supreme Court nomination. On September 28, 2018, the dating app Bumble took out a full-page advertisement in The New York Times saying simply, "Believe women".

In April 2020, a number of politicians and commentators discussed the Joe Biden sexual assault allegation in relation to the "Believe women" slogan. Representative Alexandria Ocasio-Cortez criticized what she regarded as a lack of integrity relating to the issue: "If we again want to have integrity, you can't say, you know — both believe women, support all of this, until it inconveniences you, until it inconveniences us." The National Review criticized what it considered to be Biden's hypocrisy in "his demand that Americans must believe women as a matter of unwavering reflex" during the Kavanaugh nomination. The editors said, "we hope that this incident has taught Biden that his previous approach toward accusations of sexual assault was dangerous, illiberal, and ultimately untenable." On the other hand, Senator Kirsten Gillibrand stood by Biden and remarked, "When we say 'believe women,' it's for this explicit intention of making sure there's space for all women to come forward to speak their truth, to be heard. And in this allegation, that is what Tara Reade has done."

According to The Atlantic, the adoption of a rule in Britain according to which law enforcement should believe reports of sexual assault and consider complainants to be victims led to improper police investigation of claims and the overlooking of contradicting evidence, resulting in the collapse of prosecutions and false accusations against the accused.

Criticisms and "Believe all women"
The slogan has been criticized for encouraging a presumption of guilt. Michelle Malkin, writing for The Daily Signal, suggests that it is a form of virtue signalling. Rebecca Traister, writing for The Cut, calls the phrase "compelling but flawed": it is often recast as "believe all women", and used as a "deeply problematic" and "clumsy imperative" that has "enfeebled the far more important argument that we should encourage them to speak more, and listen to them more seriously when they talk". 

"Believe all women" is a controversial alternative phrasing of the expression. Monica Hesse writing for The Washington Post argues that the slogan has always been "believe women", and that the "believe all women" variant is "a bit of grammatical gaslighting", a straw man invented by critics so that it could be attacked, and that this alternative slogan, in contrast with "believe women", "is rigid, sweeping, and leaves little room for nuance". However, Robby Soave writing for Reason disagreed with this interpretation, arguing that "#MeToo advocates demanded a presumption of belief for every individual who claims to be a sexual misconduct victim: i.e., believe all women", noting that Susan Faludi of The New York Times admitted to having "encountered some feminists who seemed genuinely to subscribe to the more extreme interpretation of the hashtag."

See also
 2017–18 United States political sexual scandals
 Believe the Children
 False accusation of rape
 HimToo movement

References

American political catchphrases
Belief
Hashtags
Crimes against women